The stripe-sided robust slider (Lerista axillaris)  is a species of skink found in Western Australia.

References

Lerista
Reptiles described in 1991
Taxa named by Glen Milton Storr